The Scandinavian Society for Iranian Studies is a Scandinavian association of scholars working in the field of Iranian Studies with members not only from Scandinavian countries, but also from the Baltic States and Finland. The goal of the Society is to enforce, develop and support Iranian Studies in all subject areas of this field, in particular philology and linguistics.

History 
The Society was founded in Oslo in 2010 on the initiative of the Founding President Ashk Dahlén.

Programs 
The Society arranges academic events in the Scandinavian countries on a regular basis for the purpose of promoting the interdisciplinary study of Iranian civilization and knowledge of Iran and the Persian-speaking world from the earliest periods to the present.
The 1st Triennial Iranian Studies Conference was held in Oslo on 30 March 2012.

References

External links 
Official Website

Cultural studies organizations
Iranian culture
Persian culture
Iranian studies
Organisations based in Oslo
Organizations established in 2010
2010 establishments in Norway